Cornaredo is a comune (municipality) in the Metropolitan City of Milan in the Italian region Lombardy, located about  northwest of Milan.

Cornaredo borders the following municipalities: Rho, Pregnana Milanese, Settimo Milanese, Bareggio, Cusago.

Twin towns
Cornaredo is twinned with:

  Sarroch, Italy

References

External links
 Official website

Cities and towns in Lombardy